= Beacon Creek =

Stream in Georgia, U.S.

Coordinates: 31°21′53″N 81°17′22″W

Beacon Creek is a stream in the U.S. state of Georgia.

Beacon Creek was so named on account of a nautical beacon at its mouth.
